Challenge of the North: Wealth from Australia's Northern Shores is a 1969 book by Ion Idriess. It was Idriess' final book and contained his ideas for developing Australia's north. He had earlier written about this topic in The Great Boomerang (1941) and Onward Australia (1943).

References

1969 non-fiction books
Books by Ion Idriess
Angus & Robertson books